Bekwai Municipal Assembly is one of the forty-three districts in Ashanti Region, Ghana. Originally created as an ordinary district assembly in 1988 when it was known as Amansie East District, which it was created from the former Amansie District Council. Later, the western part of the district was split off by a decree of president John Agyekum Kufuor on 12 November 2003 (effectively 18 February 2004) to create Amansie Central District; thus the remaining part has retained as Amansie East District. Then the eastern part of the district was later split off to create Bosome Freho District on 29 February 2008; while the remaining part was elevated to municipal district assembly status on the same year to become and has since been renamed as Bekwai Municipal District. The municipality is located in the southern part of Ashanti Region and has Bekwai as its capital town.

Footnotes
 before the split off of the Amansie Central District.

References

Sources
 
 GhanaDistricts.com
 19 New Districts Created, GhanaWeb, November 20, 2003.

2003 establishments in Ghana

Districts of Ashanti Region